USCS may refer to:

 Unified Soil Classification System, a soil classification system used in engineering and geology
 United States Code Service, an unofficial codification with editorial enhancements of United States laws published by LexisNexis
 United States Commercial Service, a trade promotion arm of the International Trade Administration within the United States Department of Commerce
 United States Customs Service, a former portion of the U.S. Federal Government dedicated to keeping illegal products outside of U.S. borders
 United States customary units, U.S. customary system of units, also known in the United States as English units
 Universal Ship Cancellation Society, an international philatelic non-profit organization
 University of South Carolina Spartanburg, a public university in Spartanburg, South Carolina
 Universidade Municipal de São Caetano do Sul, a university in São Caetano do Sul, Brazil